Pain Olympics is the debut studio album by Canadian musical collective, Crack Cloud, released July 17, 2020 via Meat Machine Records. The album was preceded by three singles, "The Next Fix", "Ouster Stew" and "Tunnel Vision" released between May 2019 until June 2020 respectively.

Promotion and release
Prior to any album announcement, Crack Cloud kicked off the campaign for Pain Olympics, with the release of the album's first single, The Next Fix on May 3, 2019, along with the self-produced music video, a series of stylishly, interconnected vignettes focused on each individual member of the collective functioning through daily life in the city, amid struggles with drug use, mental health and depression. The group's drummer and lead vocalist, Zach Choy explained the single was made as tribute "to remember the people we’ve lost to suicide and drug overdose". The single was cryptically referred to as "Part One of the PAIN OLYMPICS series" upon its release.

The following month, the group premiered the music video for Crackin Up, a commercially unreleased, b-side on June 27, 2019.  Described by the collective as "a stylized portrait" of consumerism within a "predatory media landscape", the video touches on those themes in a abstract and surrealist nature, while featuring brief pop culture references to the Dark web, Malcolm X, The Seventh Seal and Muchmusic. Despite being referred to as "Part Two" of the series, Crackin Up ultimately would be left off of the album and treated as a video only, non-album single. Following those two singles, new music would not be released from the collective until the following year.

On May 13, 2020, the group announced and confirmed the album's title as "Pain Olympics", alongside the release of the official second and lead single, Ouster Stew. The album's third single, Tunnel Vision was released June 25, 2020, along with an ambitious CGI music video produced by the collective.

Pain Olympics was released July 17, 2020. Due to the COVID-19 global pandemic, no touring could be done to promote the album. The fourth and final single, Favour Your Fortune was released October 16, 2020 with an overwhelmingly, dystopian music video, starring Cree-Canadian professional skateboarder, Joe Buffalo.

Critical reception
At Metacritic, which assigns a normalized rating out of 100 to reviews from mainstream critics, Pain Olympics received an average score of 87 from 8 reviews, indicating "universal acclaim".

In his review for NME, Will Richards praised the album, saying it's "a disturbing, joyous, cataclysmic listen that travels from claustrophobia and fear into wide-eyed expressions of joy." Richards also commends the group's ability to channel and reflect their shared experience with drug rehabilitation and harm reduction throughout the entirety of the project, further stating, "it also feels like an extension of their work on the frontline against Canada's opioid crisis, and a testament to the power of strength in numbers

Track listing

Personnel
 Zack Choy – lead vocals, drums, percussion, production, writing, lyrics,  
 Mohammad Ali Sharar – guitar, backing vocals, production, visual formatting, editing 
 Will Choy –  lead guitar, bass, backing vocals
 Bryce Cloghesy – saxophone, guitar 
 Jon Varley – lead guitar, backing vocals
 Noah Varley – bass 
 Paulina Cantoral  – vocals 
 Missy Donaldson – vocals 
 Caton Diab – trumpet, vocals 
 Clarice Scop – strings 
 Kristina Hedlund – strings 
 David Novotny  – guitar, lap steel, flute 
 Mackenzie Cruse – vocals 
 Kelsie Hjorliefson – vocals 
 Crystal Coleman – vocals 
 Jesse Atkey – vocals 
 E.H Alley – voice 
 Garnet Aroynk – bass 
 Eden Solomon – choreographer
 Scotty Alva – assistant choreographer
 Isabelle Anderson – assistant choreographer
 Kaylee Cumming – assistant choreographer
 Hannah McCuley – assistant choreographer
 Jing Wang – assistant choreographer

Technical 
 Nicolas Dirksen – arrangements, engineering, additional mixing , effects, strings, woodwinds, additional percussion, additional synths, organs
 John Paul Stewart – engineering, mixing, effects, processing
 Christian Wright – mastering
 Jennilee Marigomen – photography
 Marc Gabbana – cover art
 Wei Huang – lettering

References

2020 albums